This is a timeline of Sudanese history, comprising important legal and territorial changes and political events in Sudan and its predecessor states.  To read about the background to these events, see History of Sudan.  See that the [[list of governors of pre-independence  list of heads of state of Sudan.

19th  century

20th  century

21st century

On 11 and 15 April 2010, Southern Sudan Regional Elections: A South Sudanese There was a regional elections in Southern Sudan in which Salva Kiir Mayardit won by 93% of the votes.

See also
Timeline of Khartoum history

References

Bibliography

Sudanese
 
Years in Sudan